Jugendverband REBELL (Youth League 'Rebel') is a political youth organization in Germany. It is the youth wing of the Marxist-Leninist Party of Germany (MLPD). It was founded in 1992 through a consolidation of the Arbeiterjugendverband/Marxisten-Leninisten (AJV/ML) (english:Workersyouthleague/Marxists-Leninists) and the Marxistisch-Leninistischer Schüler- und Studentenverband (MLSV) (english:Marxist-leninist pupils- and studentsbound). According to REBELL the organisation is activ in 21 german cities (January 2018). According to the german Verfassungsschutz, REBELL had 100 members in 2014. It has although its the MLPDs youthwing an own conduct. The members of REBELL are not automatically members of the MLPD.

It has a childwing named "Rotfüchse" (english: Redfoxes) that is for children that are older than 6 years.

Like the MLPD, the organisation follows the political ideas of Karl Marx, Friedrich Engels, Mao Zedong and Josef Stalin. REBELL use mottos like "Rebellion ist gerechtfertigt!" (english: "Rebellion is justified!") or "Dem Volke dienen!" (english: "Serve the folk!"), that are said by Mao Zedong.

External links 
 rebell.info

References 

Youth wings of communist parties
Youth wings of political parties in Germany